Ancient Greek phonology is the reconstructed phonology or pronunciation of Ancient Greek. This article mostly deals with the pronunciation of the standard Attic dialect of the fifth century BC, used by Plato and other Classical Greek writers, and touches on other dialects spoken at the same time or earlier. The pronunciation of Ancient Greek is not known from direct observation, but determined from other types of evidence.

Koine Greek, the variety of Greek used after the conquests of Alexander the Great in the fourth century BC, is sometimes included in Ancient Greek, but its pronunciation is described in Koine Greek phonology. For disagreements with the reconstruction given here, see below.

Dialects

Ancient Greek was a pluricentric language, consisting of many dialects. All Greek dialects derive from Proto-Greek and they share certain characteristics, but there were also distinct differences in pronunciation. For instance, the form of Doric in Crete had a digraph , which likely stood for a sound not present in Attic. The early form of Ionic in which the Iliad and Odyssey were composed (Homeric), and the Aeolic dialect of Sappho, likely had the phoneme  at the beginnings of words, sometimes represented by the letter digamma , but it had been lost in the standard Attic dialect.

The pluricentric nature of Ancient Greek differs from that of Latin, which was composed of basically one variety from the earliest Old Latin texts until Classical Latin. Latin only formed dialects once it was spread over Europe by the Roman Empire; these Vulgar Latin dialects became the Romance languages.

The main dialect groups of Ancient Greek are Arcadocypriot, Aeolic, Doric, Ionic, and Attic. These form two main groups: East Greek, which includes Arcadocypriot, Aeolic, Ionic, and Attic, and West Greek, which consists of Doric along with Northwest Greek and Achaean.

Of the main dialects, all but Arcadocypriot have literature in them. The Ancient Greek literary dialects do not necessarily represent the native speech of the authors that use them. A primarily Ionic-Aeolic dialect, for instance, is used in epic poetry, while pure Aeolic is used in lyric poetry. Both Attic and Ionic are used in prose, and Attic is used in most parts of the Athenian tragedies, with Doric forms in the choral sections.

Early East Greek
Most of the East Greek dialects palatalized or assibilated  to  before . West Greek, including Doric, did not undergo this sound change in certain cases, and through the influence of Doric neither did the Thessalian and Boeotian dialects of Aeolic.
 Attic , Doric  ('he places')
 Attic , Doric  ('they are')
 Attic , Doric  ('twenty')

Arcadocypriot was one of the first Greek dialects in Greece. Mycenaean Greek, the form of Greek spoken before the Greek Dark Ages, seems to be an early form of Arcadocypriot. Clay tablets with Mycenaean Greek in Linear B have been found over a wide area, from Thebes in Central Greece, to Mycenae and Pylos on the Peloponnese, to Knossos on Crete. However, during the Ancient Greek period, Arcadocypriot was only spoken in Arcadia, in the interior of the Peloponnese, and on Cyprus. The dialects of these two areas remained remarkably similar despite the great geographical distance.

Aeolic is closely related to Arcadocypriot. It was originally spoken in eastern Greece north of the Peloponnese: in Thessaly, in Locris, Phocis, and southern Aetolia, and in Boeotia, a region close to Athens. Aeolic was carried to Aeolis, on the coast of Asia Minor, and the nearby island of Lesbos. By the time of Ancient Greek, the only Aeolic dialects that remained in Greece were Thessalian and Boeotian. The Aeolic dialects of Greece adopted some characteristics of Doric, since they were located near Doric-speaking areas, while the Aeolian and Lesbian dialects remained pure.

These are reflected in spelling (see Boeotian Greek phonology). Aeolic also retained .

Homeric or Epic Greek, the literary form of Archaic Greek used in the epic poems, Iliad and the Odyssey, is based on early Ionic and Aeolic, with Arcadocypriot forms. In its original form, it likely had the semivowel , as indicated by the meter in some cases.

West Greek
The Doric dialect, the most important member of West Greek, originated from western Greece. Through the Dorian invasion, Doric displaced the native Arcadocypriot and Aeolic dialects in some areas of central Greece, on the Peloponnese, and on Crete, and strongly influenced the Thessalian and Boeotian dialects of Aeolic.

Doric dialects are classified by which vowel they have as the result of compensatory lengthening and contraction: those that have   are called Severer or Old, and those that have , as Attic does, are called Milder or New. Laconian and Cretan, spoken in Laconia, the region of Sparta, and on Crete, are two Old Doric dialects.

Attic and Ionic
Attic and Ionic share a vowel shift not present in any other East or West Greek dialects. All other East and West Greek dialects retain original .

Ionic was spoken around the Aegean Sea, including in Ionia, a region of Anatolia south of Aeolis, for which it was named. Ionic contracts vowels less often than Attic (see below).

Attic is usually the dialect taught in modern introductory Ancient Greek courses, and the one that has much of the most important literature written in it. It was spoken in Athens and Attica, the surrounding region. Later writers, such as Plato, use the native Attic forms.

Later Greek

Koine, the form of Greek spoken during the Hellenistic period, was primarily based on Attic Greek, with some influences from other dialects. In the Byzantine period it developed into Medieval Greek, which later became standard Modern Greek or Demotic.

Tsakonian, a modern form of Greek mutually unintelligible with Standard Modern Greek, derived from the Laconian variety of Doric, and is therefore the only surviving descendant of a non-Attic dialect.

Consonants
Attic Greek had about 15 consonant phonemes: nine stop consonants, two fricatives, and four or six sonorants. Modern Greek has about the same number of consonants. The main difference between the two is that Modern Greek has voiced and voiceless fricatives that developed from Ancient Greek voiced and aspirated stops.

In the table below, the phonemes of standard Attic are unmarked, allophones are enclosed in parentheses. The sounds marked by asterisks appear in dialects or in earlier forms of Greek, but may not be phonemes in standard Attic.

Stops

Ancient Greek had nine stops. The grammarians classified them in three groups, distinguished by voice-onset time: voiceless aspirated, voiceless unaspirated (tenuis), and voiced. The aspirated stops are written . The voiced stops are written . For the Ancient Greek terms for these three groups, see below; see also the section on spirantization.

English distinguishes two types of stops: voiceless and voiced. Voiceless stops have three main pronunciations (allophones): moderately aspirated at the beginning of a word before a vowel, unaspirated after , and unaspirated, unreleased, glottalized, or debuccalized at the end of a word. English voiced stops are often only partially voiced. Thus, some pronunciations of the English stops are similar to the pronunciations of Ancient Greek stops.
 voiceless aspirated t in tie 
 tenuis t in sty 
 tenuis, unreleased, glottalized, or debuccalized t in light 
 partially voiced d in die  or

Fricatives
Attic Greek had only two fricative phonemes: the voiceless alveolar sibilant  and the glottal fricative .

 is often called the aspirate (see below). Attic generally kept it, but some non-Attic dialects during the Classical period lost it (see below). It mostly occurred at the beginning of words, because it was usually lost between vowels, except in two rare words. This can be seen in Old Attic inscriptions, where  was written using the letterform of eta (see below), which was the source of H in the Latin alphabet:
 Old Attic inscriptional forms
  , standard   ('faithful to an oath')
  , standard   ('sitting beside, assessor')
  , standard   ('let him be present')
   ('yay!')
   ('peacock')

 was a voiceless coronal sibilant. This indicates that the Greek sound was a hissing sound rather than a hushing sound: like English s in see rather than sh in she. It was pronounced as a voiced  before voiced consonants.

According to W.S. Allen, zeta  in Attic Greek likely represented the consonant cluster , phonetically . For metrical purposes it was treated as a double consonant, thus forming a heavy syllable. In Archaic Greek, when the letter was adopted from Phoenician zayin, the sound was probably an affricate . In Koine Greek,  represented . It is more likely that this developed from  rather than from Attic .
Ζεύς ('Zeus') — Archaic , Attic , late Koine 

Nasals
Ancient Greek has two nasals: the bilabial nasal , written  and the alveolar nasal , written . On occasion, the  phoneme participates in true gemination without any assimilation in place of articulation, as for example in the word . Artificial gemination for metrical purposes is also found occasionally, as in the form , occurring in the first verse of Homer's Odyssey.

Liquids

The letter lambda  probably represented a lateral ("clear")  as in Modern Greek and most European languages, rather than a velarized ("dark")  as in English in coda position.

The letter rho  was pronounced as an alveolar trill , as in Italian or Modern Greek rather than as in standard varieties of English or French. At the beginning of a word, it was pronounced as a voiceless alveolar trill .

Semivowels
The semivowels  were not present in standard Attic Greek at the beginnings of words. Allen suggests that these were simply semivocalic allophones of the vowels, although in some cases they developed from earlier semivowels.

Boeotian   for Attic  Akademos

Evidence from the poetic meter of Homer suggests that  also occurred in the Archaic Greek of the Iliad and Odyssey, although they would not have been pronounced by Attic speakers and are not written in the Attic-influenced form of the text. The presence of these consonants would explain some cases of absence of elision, some cases in which the meter demands a heavy syllable but the text has a light syllable (positional quantity), and some cases in which a long vowel before a short vowel is not shortened (absence of epic correption).

In the table below the scansion of the examples is shown with the breve  for light syllables, the macron  for heavy ones, and the pipe  for the divisions between metrical feet.

Doubled consonants
In Ancient Greek poetry, a vowel followed by a double consonant counts as a heavy syllable in meter.

Gemination was lost in Standard Modern Greek, so that all consonants that used to be geminated are pronounced as singletons. Cypriot Greek, the Modern Greek dialect of Cyprus, however, preserves geminate consonants.

This sound arose from historic palatalization (see below).

Vowels
Archaic and Classical Greek vowels and diphthongs varied by dialect. The tables below show the vowels of Classical Attic in the IPA, paired with the vowel letters that represent them in the standard Ionic alphabet. The earlier Old Attic alphabet had certain differences. Vowel length was phonemic: some words are distinguished from each other by vowel length.

This is the reason for the terms for vowel letters described below. In grammars, textbooks, or dictionaries,  are sometimes marked with macrons to indicate that they are long, or breves to indicate that they are short.

For the purposes of accent, vowel length is measured in morae: long vowels and most diphthongs count as two morae; short vowels, and the diphthongs  in certain endings, count as one mora. A one-mora vowel could be accented with high pitch, but two-mora vowels could be accented with falling or rising pitch.

Monophthongs

Close and open vowels
The close and open short vowels  were similar in quality to the corresponding long vowels .

Proto-Greek close back rounded  shifted to front  early in Attic and Ionic, around the 6th or 7th century BC (see below).  remained only in diphthongs; it did not shift in Boeotian, so when Boeotians adopted the Attic alphabet, they wrote their unshifted  using .

Mid vowels
The situation with the mid vowels was more complex. In the early Classical period, there were two short mid vowels , but four long mid vowels: close-mid  and open-mid . Since the short mid vowels changed to long close-mid  rather than long open-mid  by compensatory lengthening in Attic, E.H. Sturtevant suggests that the short mid vowels were close-mid, but Allen says this is not necessarily true.

These changes triggered a shift of the open-mid vowels  to become mid or close-mid , and this is the pronunciation they had in early Koine Greek.

This also explains the vocalism of New Testament Greek words such as λεγεών ('legion'; < Lat. legio) or λέντιον ('towel'; < Lat. linteum), where Latin  was perceived to be similar to Greek .

In Attic, the open-mid  and close-mid  each have three main origins. Some cases of the open-mid vowels  developed from Proto-Greek . In other cases they developed from contraction.

In a few cases, the long close-mid vowels  developed from monophthongization of the pre-Classical falling diphthongs . In most cases, they arose through compensatory lengthening of the short vowels  or through contraction.

In some dialects of Doric, such as Laconian and Cretan, contraction and compensatory lengthening resulted in open-mid vowels , and in others they resulted in the close-mid . Sometimes the Doric dialects using the open-mid vowels are called Severer, and the ones using the close-mid vowels are called Milder.

Diphthongs
Diphthongs with a short first element are sometimes called "proper diphthongs", while diphthongs with a long first element are sometimes called "improper diphthongs." Overall Attic and Koine show a pattern of monophthongization: they tend to change diphthongs to single vowels.

The long diphthongs  occurred rarely.

In the tables below, the diphthongs that were monophthongized in most cases are preceded by an asterisk, and the rarer diphthongs are in parentheses.

The second element of a diphthong  was often pronounced as a doubled semivowel  or  before vowels, and in other cases it was often lost:
   ('Athenians'): 
   ('I do'): either  or 
 Doric  : 
 Attic  : 
   ('I command'): 
   ('sign'): 

The diphthong  merged with the long close front rounded vowel  in Koine. It likely first became . Change to  would be assimilation: the back vowel  becoming front  because of the following front vowel . This may have been the pronunciation in Classical Attic.

Thucydides reports the confusion of two words (2:54), which makes more sense if  was pronounced :
  ('plague'): possibly 
  ('famine'): 

In the diphthongs , the offglide  became a consonant in Koine Greek, and they became Modern Greek . The long diphthongs  lost their offglide and merged with the long vowels  by the time of Koine Greek.

Spelling
Many different forms of the Greek alphabet were used for the regional dialects of the Greek language during the Archaic and early Classical periods. The Attic dialect, however, used two forms. The first was the Old Attic alphabet, and the second is the Ionic alphabet, introduced to Athens around the end of the 5th century BC during the archonship of Eucleides. The last is the standard alphabet in modern editions of Ancient Greek texts, and the one used for Classical Attic, standard Koine, and Medieval Greek, finally developing into the alphabet used for Modern Greek.

Consonant spelling
  ('offspring'), occasionally  in inscriptions
  ('inborn')

 was written with sigma .

Vowel spelling

The above information about the usage of the vowel letters applies to the classical orthography of Attic, after Athens took over the orthographic conventions of the Ionic alphabet in 403 BC. All five vowel symbols could at that stage denote either a long or a short vowel. Moreover, the letters  and  could respectively denote the long open-mid , the long close-mid  and the short mid phonemes . However, the remaining vowel letters ,  and  continued to be ambiguous between long and short phonemes.

Spelling of /h/
In the Old Attic alphabet,  was written with the letterform of eta . In the Ionic dialect of Asia Minor,  was lost early on, and the letter  in the Ionic alphabet represented . In 403 BC, when the Ionic alphabet was adopted in Athens, the sound  ceased to be represented in writing.

In some inscriptions  was represented by a symbol formed from the left-hand half of the original letter: . Later grammarians, during the time of the Hellenistic Koine, developed that symbol further into a diacritic, the rough breathing (for short), which was written on the top of the initial vowel. These marks were not used consistently until the time of the Byzantine Empire.

Phonotactics
Ancient Greek words were divided into syllables. A word has one syllable for every short vowel, long vowel, or diphthong. In addition, syllables began with a consonant if possible, and sometimes ended with a consonant. Consonants at the beginning of the syllable are the syllable onset, the vowel in the middle is a nucleus, and the consonant at the end is a coda.

In dividing words into syllables, each vowel or diphthong belongs to one syllable. A consonant between vowels goes with the following vowel. In the following transcriptions, a period  separates syllables.
  ('I say'):  (two syllables)
  ('this kind'):  (three syllables)
  ('if only he would want'):  (four syllables)
  ('sun's') (Homeric Greek):  (five syllables)

Any remaining consonants are added at the end of a syllable. And when a double consonant occurs between vowels, it is divided between syllables. One half of the double consonant goes to the previous syllable, forming a coda, and one goes to the next, forming an onset. Clusters of two or three consonants are also usually divided between syllables, with at least one consonant joining the previous vowel and forming the syllable coda of its syllable, but see below.
  ('another'): 
  ('there is'): 
  ('opinion'): 
  ('enemy'):

Syllable weight
Syllables in Ancient Greek were either light or heavy. This distinction is important in Ancient Greek poetry, which was made up of patterns of heavy and light syllables. Syllable weight is based on both consonants and vowels. Ancient Greek accent, by contrast, is only based on vowels.

All other syllables were heavy: that is, syllables ending in a long vowel or diphthong, a short vowel and consonant, or a long vowel or diphthong and consonant.
  : light – heavy;
  : heavy – heavy – light;
  : heavy – heavy – heavy – light;
  : heavy – light – light – heavy – light.

Greek grammarians called heavy syllables  ('long', singular ), and placed them in two categories. They called a syllable with a long vowel or diphthong  ('long by nature'), and a syllable ending in a consonant  ('long by position'). However, Indian grammarians distinguished vowel length and syllable weight by using the terms heavy and light for syllable quantity and the terms long and short only for vowel length. This article adopts their terminology, since not all metrically heavy syllables have long vowels; e.g.:
   is a heavy syllable having a long vowel, "long by nature";
   is a heavy syllable having a diphthong, "long by nature";
   is a heavy syllable ending in a consonant, "long by position".

Poetic meter shows which syllables in a word counted as heavy, and knowing syllable weight allows us to determine how consonant clusters were divided between syllables. Syllables before double consonants, and most syllables before consonant clusters, count as heavy. Here the letters  count as consonant clusters. This indicates that double consonants and most consonant clusters were divided between syllables, with at least the first consonant belonging to the preceding syllable.
  ('different'): heavy – heavy
  ('so that'): heavy – light
  ('worthy'): heavy – light – heavy
  ('may I see!'): heavy – heavy – heavy – light
  ('rejoicing' ): light – heavy – light – light – heavy

In Attic poetry, syllables before a cluster of a stop and a liquid or nasal are commonly light rather than heavy. This was called  ('Attic shortening'), since here an ordinarily "long" syllable became "short".
 ('of a father'): Homeric  (heavy-heavy), Attic  (light-heavy)

Onset
In Attic Greek, any single consonant and many consonant clusters can occur as a syllable onset (the beginning of a syllable). Certain consonant clusters occur as onsets, while others do not occur.

Six stop clusters occur. All of them agree in voice-onset time, and begin with a labial or velar and end with a dental. Thus, the clusters  are allowed. Certain stop clusters do not occur as onsets: clusters beginning with a dental and ending with a labial or velar, and clusters of stops that disagree in voice onset time.

Coda

Accent

Ancient Greek had a pitch accent, unlike the stress accent of Modern Greek and English. One mora of a word was accented with high pitch. A mora is a unit of vowel length; in Ancient Greek, short vowels have one mora and long vowels and diphthongs have two morae. Thus, a one-mora vowel could have accent on its one mora, and a two-mora vowel could have accent on either of its two morae. The position of accent was free, with certain limitations. In a given word, it could appear in several different positions, depending on the lengths of the vowels in the word.

In the examples below, long vowels and diphthongs are represented with two vowel symbols, one for each mora. This does not mean that the long vowel has two separate vowels in different syllables. Syllables are separated by periods ; any sound between two periods is pronounced in one syllable.
  (long vowel with two morae): phonemic transcription , phonetic transcription  (one syllable)
  (two short vowels with one mora each): phonemic transcription , phonetic transcription  (two syllables)

The accented mora is marked with acute accent . A vowel with rising pitch contour is marked with a caron , and a vowel with a falling pitch contour is marked with a circumflex .

The position of the accent in Ancient Greek was phonemic and distinctive: certain words are distinguished by which mora in them is accented. The position of the accent was also distinctive on long vowels and diphthongs: either the first or the second mora could be accented. Phonetically, a two-mora vowel had a rising or falling pitch contour, depending on which of its two morae was accented:

Accent marks were never used until around 200 BC. They were first used in Alexandria, and Aristophanes of Byzantium is said to have invented them. There are three: the acute, circumflex, and grave . The shape of the circumflex is a merging of the acute and grave.

The acute represented high or rising pitch, the circumflex represented falling pitch, but what the grave represented is uncertain. Early on, the grave was used on every syllable without an acute or circumflex. Here the grave marked all unaccented syllables, which had lower pitch than the accented syllable.
  

Later on, a grave was only used to replace a final acute before another full word; the acute was kept before an enclitic or at the end of a phrase. This usage was standardized in the Byzantine era, and is used in modern editions of Ancient Greek texts. Here it might mark a lowered version of a high-pitched syllable.
   ('there is something beautiful') ( is at the end of the sentence)
   ('it is beautiful') ( here is an enclitic)
   ('good and beautiful')

Sound changes
Greek underwent many sound changes. Some occurred between Proto-Indo-European (PIE) and Proto-Greek (PGr), some between the Mycenaean Greek and Ancient Greek periods, which are separated by about 300 years (the Greek Dark Ages), and some during the Koine Greek period. Some sound changes occurred only in particular Ancient Greek dialects, not in others, and certain dialects, such as Boeotian and Laconian, underwent sound changes similar to the ones that occurred later in Koine. This section primarily describes sound changes that occurred between the Mycenaean and Ancient Greek periods and during the Ancient Greek period.

For sound changes occurring in Proto-Greek and in Koine Greek, see  and Koine Greek phonology.

Debuccalization
In Proto-Greek, the PIE sibilant  became  by debuccalization in many cases.
 PIE  >   ('the') — compare Sanskrit 
 PIE  >   ('seven') — compare Latin , Sanskrit sapta

 PIE  >  > Attic   ('flow') — compare Sanskrit 
PIE  > Corfu  , Attic   ('stream')
 PIE  > Pamphylian  , Attic  
 PIE  > Corfu  , Attic   ('taking')

PIE  remained in clusters with stops and at the end of a word:
 PIE  >   ('is') — compare Sanskrit , Latin 
 PIE  >   ('I will have')
 PIE  >   ('kind') — compare Sanskrit , Latin 

The PIE semivowel , IPA , was sometimes debuccalized and sometimes strengthened initially. How this development was conditioned is unclear; the involvement of the laryngeals has been suggested. In certain other positions, it was kept, and frequently underwent other sound changes:
 PIE  > ,   ('who') — compare Sanskrit 
 PIE  > early  > Attic   ('yoke') — compare Sanskrit , Latin 
  > Proto-Greek  >   ('part') (compare )

Between vowels,  became . Intervocalic  probably occurred in Mycenaean. In most cases it was lost by the time of Ancient Greek. In a few cases, it was transposed to the beginning of the word. Later, initial  was lost by psilosis.
 PIE *ǵénh₁es-os > PGr  > Ionic   > Attic  ('of a race')  (contraction;  of )
 Mycenaean pa-we-a₂, possibly , later   ('pieces of cloth')
 PIE  > Proto-Greek  >   ('singe')

By morphological leveling, intervocalic  was kept in certain noun and verb forms: for instance, the  marking the stems for the future and aorist tenses.
  ('I release, I will release, I released')

Grassmann's law
 PIE  >   ('I placed')
  >   ('I place')
  >   ('I have placed')
  >   ('hair')
  >   ('hairs')
 PIE  >   ('I will have')
  >   ('I have')

Palatalization
In some cases, the sound   in Attic corresponds to the sound   in other dialects. This sound was likely pronounced as an affricate  or  earlier in the history of Greek, but inscriptions do not show the spelling , which suggests that an affricate pronunciation did not occur in the Classical period.
 * >  > , Attic  ('weaker') — compare  ('softly')
 PIE  >  >  > , Attic  ('I arrange') — compare  ('battle line') and Latin 
 PIE  >  >  > , Attic  ('tongue') — compare  ('point')

Loss of labiovelars
Mycenaean Greek had three labialized velar stops , aspirated, tenuis, and voiced. They were written all using the same symbols in Linear B, and are transcribed as q.

In Ancient Greek, all labialized velars merged with other stops: labials , dentals , and velars . Which one they became depended on dialect and phonological environment. Because of this, certain words that originally had labialized velars have different stops depending on dialect, and certain words from the same root have different stops even in the same Ancient Greek dialect.
PIE, PGr  > Attic , Thessalian Doric  ('who?, what?') — compare Latin 
PIE, PGr  > Attic , Ionic  ('what kind?')
PIE  > PGr  > Attic  ('I strike')
 > PGr  > Attic  ('slaughtering')
PIE  ('notice') > Mycenaean qe-te-o ('paid'), Ancient Greek  ('pay')
 ('honor')
 ('penalty') > Latin poena)

PG  > Mycenaean qo-u-ko-ro, Ancient Greek  ('cowherd')
Mycenaean a-pi-qo-ro, Ancient Greek  ('attendant')

Psilosis
This sound change did not occur in Attic until the Koine period, but occurred in East Ionic and Lesbian Aeolic, and therefore can be seen in certain Homeric forms. These dialects are called psilotic.
 Homeric  , Attic   '(sun')
 Homeric  , Attic   ('dawn')
 Homeric  , Attic   ('border')

Even later, during the Koine Greek period,  disappeared totally from Greek and never reappeared, resulting in Modern Greek not possessing this phoneme at all.

Spirantization
The Classical Greek aspirated and voiced stops changed to voiceless and voiced fricatives during the period of Koine Greek (spirantization, a form of lenition).

Spirantization of  occurred earlier in Laconian Greek. These spellings indicate that  was pronounced as a dental fricative  or a sibilant , the same change that occurred later in Koine.

Compensatory lengthening
In Attic, Ionic, and Doric, vowels were usually lengthened when a following consonant was lost. The syllable before the consonant was originally heavy, but loss of the consonant would cause it to be light. Therefore, the vowel before the consonant was lengthened, so that the syllable would continue to be heavy. This sound change is called compensatory lengthening, because the vowel length compensates for the loss of the consonant. The result of lengthening depended on dialect and time period. The table below shows all possible results:

Wherever the digraphs  correspond to original diphthongs they are called "genuine diphthongs", in all other cases, they are called "spurious diphthongs".

Contraction
Contractions involving diphthongs ending in  resulted in the long diphthongs .

Uncontracted forms are found in other dialects, such as in Ionic.

Monophthongization
The diphthongs  became the long monophthongs  and  before the Classical period.

Vowel raising and fronting
In Archaic Greek, upsilon  represented the back vowel . In Attic and Ionic, this vowel was fronted around the 6th or 7th century BC. It likely first became central , and then the front . For example, the onomatopoietic verb μῡκάομαι ("to moo") was archaically pronounced /muːkáomai̯/, but had become /myːkáomai̯/ in 5th century Attic.

The fact that  was never confused with  indicates that  was fronted before  was raised.

In late Koine Greek,  was raised and merged with original .

Attic–Ionic vowel shift
This shift did not happen in the other dialects. Thus, some cases of Attic and Ionic  correspond to Doric and Aeolic , and other cases correspond to Doric and Aeolic .
Doric and Aeolic , Attic and Ionic   ('mother') — compare Latin 

  Aeschines
 
 incorrect  
 
  Hippocrates
 
 
 incorrect  

 Attic and Doric  ('blade of an oar')
 incorrect Doric form 

 Doric , Attic , Ionic   ('day')
 Attic , Ionic   ('such as')
 Attic , Ionic   ('new') < 

Sihler says that Attic  is from reversion.

This shift did not affect cases of long  that developed from the contraction of certain sequences of vowels that contain . The examples below are shown with the hypothetical original forms from which they were contracted.
 infinitive:   "to see" <  
 third person singular present indicative active:   "he sees" <  
 third person singular imperfect indicative active:   "he saw" <  

Also unaffected was long  that arose by compensatory lengthening of short . Thus, Attic and Ionic had a contrast between the feminine genitive singular   and feminine accusative plural  , forms of the adjective and pronoun  "this, that". The first derived from an original *tautās with shifting of ā to ē, the other from *tautans with compensatory lengthening of ans to ās.

Assimilation
When one consonant comes next to another in verb or noun conjugation or word derivation, various sandhi rules apply. When these rules affect the forms of nouns and adjectives or of compound words, they are reflected in spelling. Between words, the same rules also applied, but they are not reflected in standard spelling, only in inscriptions.

Rules:
 Most basic rule: When two sounds appear next to each other, the first assimilates in voicing and aspiration to the second.
 This applies fully to stops. Fricatives assimilate only in voicing, sonorants do not assimilate.

The alveolar nasal  assimilates in place of articulation, changing to a labial or velar nasal before labials or velars:
 ;
 

 ('to Athens') < 
 ('set') < Proto-Indo-European  (Latin : reduplicated present), from zero-grade of the root of  <  "seat"
 ('on foot') < PGr , from the root of  "foot"

Terminology
Ancient grammarians, such as Aristotle in his Poetics and Dionysius Thrax in his Art of Grammar, categorized letters according to what speech sounds ( 'elements') they represented. Dionysius also called consonants in general  ('pronounced with [a vowel]').

Many also use the root of the deverbal noun  ('voice, sound').

The Latin words are feminine because the Latin noun  ('letter') is feminine. They were later borrowed into English as vowel, consonant, semivowel, mute.

These adjectives describe whether the vowel letters represented both long and short vowels, only short vowels or only long vowels. The category of  included both diphthongs and the spurious diphthongs , which were pronounced as long vowels in the Classical period.

The categories  and  roughly correspond to the modern terms continuant and stop. Greek grammarians placed the letters  in the category of stops, not of continuants, indicating that they represented stops in Ancient Greek, rather than fricatives, as in Modern Greek.

The first two terms indicate a binary opposition typical of Greek thought: they referred to stops with and without aspiration. The voiced stops did not fit in either category and so they were called "middle". The concepts of voice and voicelessness (presence or absence of vibration of the vocal folds) were unknown to the Greeks and were not developed in the Western grammatical tradition until the 19th century, when the Sanskrit grammatical tradition began to be studied by Westerners.

Later, a diacritic for the sound was created, and it was called pleonastically  ('rough breathing').

Reconstruction
The above information is based on a large body of evidence which was discussed extensively by linguists and philologists of the 19th and 20th centuries. The following section provides a short summary of the kinds of evidence and arguments that have been used in this debate, and gives some hints as to the sources of uncertainty that still prevails with respect to some details.

Internal evidence

Evidence from spelling
Whenever a new set of written symbols, such as an alphabet, is created for a language, the written symbols typically correspond to the spoken sounds, and the spelling or orthography is therefore phonemic or transparent: It is easy to pronounce a word by seeing how it is spelled, and conversely to spell a word by knowing how it is pronounced. Until the pronunciation of the language changes, spelling mistakes do not occur since spelling and pronunciation match each other.

When the pronunciation changes, there are two options. The first is spelling reform: The spelling of words is changed to reflect the new pronunciation. In this case, the date of a spelling reform generally indicates the approximate time when the pronunciation changed.

The second option is that the spelling remains the same despite the changes in pronunciation. In this case, the spelling system is called conservative or historical since it reflects the pronunciation in an earlier period of the language. It is also called opaque because there is not a simple correspondence between written symbols and spoken sounds: The spelling of words becomes an increasingly unreliable indication of their contemporary pronunciation, and knowing how to pronounce a word provides increasingly insufficient and misleading information on how to spell it.

In a language with a historical spelling system, spelling mistakes indicate changes in pronunciation. Writers with incomplete knowledge of the spelling system misspell words, and in general their misspellings reflect the way they pronounce the words.

 If scribes very often confuse two letters, this implies that the sounds denoted by the two letters are the same, that the sounds have merged. Later still,  was confused with the already merged .
 If scribes omit a letter where it would usually be written, or insert it where it does not belong (hypercorrection), this implies that the sound that the letter represented has been lost in speech. This happened early with word-initial rough breathing in most forms of Greek. Another example is the occasional omission of the iota subscript of long diphthongs (see above).

Spelling mistakes provide limited evidence: they only indicate the pronunciation of the scribe who made the spelling mistake, not the pronunciation of all speakers of the language at the time. Ancient Greek was a language with many regional variants and social registers. Many of the pronunciation changes of Koine Greek probably occurred earlier in some regional pronunciations and sociolects of Attic even in the Classical Age, but the older pronunciations were preserved in more learned speech.

Onomatopoeic words
Greek literature sometimes contains representations of animal cries in Greek letters. Latin ),  for the roaring of lions (cf.

Morpho-phonological facts
Sounds undergo regular changes, such as assimilation or dissimilation, in certain environments within words, which are sometimes indicated in writing. These can be used to reconstruct the nature of the sounds involved.
 <> at the end of some words are regularly changed to <> when preceding a rough breathing in the next word.
 <> at the end of the first member of composite words are regularly changed to <> when preceding a spiritus asper in the next member of the composite word. Thus e.g.: 

Non-standard spellings
Morphophonological alternations like the above are often treated differently in non-standard spellings than in standardised literary spelling. This may lead to doubts about the representativeness of the literary dialect and may in some cases force slightly different reconstructions than if one were only to take the literary texts of the high standard language into account. Thus, e.g.:

non-standard epigraphical spelling sometimes indicates assimilation of final  to  before voiced consonants in a following word, or of final  to  before aspirated sounds, in words like .

Metrical evidence
The metres used in Classical Greek poetry are based on the patterns of light and heavy syllables, and can thus sometimes provide evidence as to the length of vowels where this is not evident from the orthography. By the 4th century AD poetry was normally written using stress-based metres, suggesting that the distinctions between long and short vowels had been lost by then, and the pitch accent had been replaced by a stress accent.

External evidence

Orthoepic descriptions
Some ancient grammarians attempt to give systematic descriptions of the sounds of the language. In other authors one can sometimes find occasional remarks about correct pronunciation of certain sounds. However, both types of evidence are often difficult to interpret, because the phonetic terminology of the time was often vague, and it is often not clear in what relation the described forms of the language stand to those which were actually spoken by different groups of the population.

Important ancient authors include:

 Dionysius Thrax
 Dionysius of Halicarnassus
 Aelius Herodianus

Cross-dialectal comparison
Sometimes the comparison of standard Attic Greek with the written forms of other Greek dialects, or the humorous renderings of dialectal speech in Attic theatrical works, can provide hints as to the phonetic value of certain spellings. An example of this treatment with Spartan Greek is given above.

Loanwords
The spelling of Greek loanwords in other languages and vice versa can provide important hints about pronunciation. However, the evidence is often difficult to interpret or indecisive. The sounds of loanwords are often not taken over identically into the receiving language. Where the receiving language lacks a sound that corresponds exactly to that of the source language, sounds are usually mapped to some other, similar sound.

In this regard, Latin is of great value to the reconstruction of ancient Greek phonology because of its close proximity to the Greek world which caused numerous Greek words to be borrowed by the Romans. Thus, in the 2nd century AD,  replaces . At about the same time, the letter  also begins to be used as a substitute for the letter , for lack of a better choice, indicating that the sound of Greek theta had become a fricative as well.

Latin often wrote  for Greek . This can be explained by the fact that Latin  were pronounced as near-close , and therefore were as similar to the Ancient Greek mid vowels  as to the Ancient Greek close vowels .
 > 
 > 

Sanskrit, Persian, and Armenian also provide evidence.

The quality of short  is shown by some transcriptions between Ancient Greek and Sanskrit. Greek short  was transcribed with Sanskrit long , not with Sanskrit short , which had a closer pronunciation: . Conversely, Sanskrit short  was transcribed with Greek .
 Gr   > Skt   (an astrological term)
 Skt   > Gr

Comparison with older alphabets
The Greek alphabet developed from the older Phoenician alphabet. It may be assumed that the Greeks tended to assign to each Phoenician letter that Greek sound which most closely resembled the Phoenician sound. But, as with loanwords, the interpretation is not straightforward.

Comparison with younger/derived alphabets
The Greek alphabet was in turn the basis of other alphabets, notably the Etruscan and Coptic and later the Armenian, Gothic, and Cyrillic. Similar arguments can be derived in these cases as in the Phoenician-Greek case.

Comparison with Modern Greek
Any reconstruction of Ancient Greek needs to take into account how the sounds later developed towards Modern Greek, and how these changes could have occurred. In general, the changes between the reconstructed Ancient Greek and Modern Greek are assumed to be unproblematic in this respect by historical linguists, because all the relevant changes (spirantization, chain-shifts of long vowels towards , loss of initial , restructuring of vowel-length and accentuation systems, etc.) are of types that are cross-linguistically frequently attested and relatively easy to explain.

Comparative reconstruction of Indo-European
Systematic relationships between sounds in Greek and sounds in other Indo-European languages are taken as strong evidence for reconstruction by historical linguists, because such relationships indicate that these sounds may go back to an inherited sound in the proto-language.

History of the reconstruction of ancient pronunciation

The Renaissance
Until the 15th century (during the time of the Byzantine Greek Empire) ancient Greek texts were pronounced exactly like contemporary Greek when they were read aloud. From about 1486, various scholars (notably Antonio of Lebrixa, Girolamo Aleandro, and Aldus Manutius) judged that this pronunciation appeared to be inconsistent with the descriptions handed down by ancient grammarians, and suggested alternative pronunciations.

Johann Reuchlin, the leading Greek scholar in the West around 1500, had taken his Greek learning from Byzantine émigré scholars, and continued to use the modern pronunciation. This pronunciation system was called into question by Desiderius Erasmus (1466–1536) who in 1528 published , a philological treatise clothed in the form of a philosophical dialogue, in which he developed the idea of a historical reconstruction of ancient Latin and Greek pronunciation. The two models of pronunciation became soon known, after their principal proponents, as the "Reuchlinian" and the "Erasmian" system, or, after the characteristic vowel pronunciations, as the "iotacist" (or "itacist" ) and the "etacist" system, respectively.

Erasmus' reconstruction was based on a wide range of arguments, derived from the philological knowledge available at his time. In the main, he strove for a more regular correspondence of letters to sounds, assuming that different letters must have stood for different sounds, and same letters for same sounds. He also insisted on taking the accounts of ancient grammarians literally, for instance where they described vowels as being distinctively long and short, or the acute and circumflex accents as being clearly distinguished by pitch contours. In addition, he drew on evidence from word correspondences between Greek and Latin as well as some other European languages. Some of his arguments in this direction are, in hindsight, mistaken, because he naturally lacked much of the knowledge developed through later linguistic work. Thus, he could not distinguish between Latin-Greek word relations based on loans (e.g.  — ) on the one hand, and those based on common descent from Indo-European (e.g.  — ) on the other. He also fell victim to a few spurious relations due to mere accidental similarity (e.g. Greek  'to sacrifice' — French , 'to kill').

Erasmus also took great pains to assign to the members in his reconstructed system plausible phonetic values. This was no easy task, as contemporary grammatical theory lacked the rich and precise terminology to describe such values.

The reception of Erasmus' idea among his contemporaries was mixed. Most prominent among those scholars who resisted his move was Philipp Melanchthon, a student of Reuchlin's. Debate in humanist circles continued up into the 17th century, but the situation remained undecided for several centuries. (See Pronunciation of Ancient Greek in teaching.)

The 19th century
A renewed interest in the issues of reconstructed pronunciation arose during the 19th century. On the one hand, the new science of historical linguistics, based on the method of comparative reconstruction, took a vivid interest in Greek. It soon established beyond any doubt that Greek was descended in parallel with many other languages from the common source of the Indo-European proto-language. This had important consequences for how its phonological system must be reconstructed. At the same time, continued work in philology and archeology was bringing to light an ever-growing corpus of non-standard, non-literary and non-classical Greek writings, e.g. inscriptions and later also papyri. These added considerably to what could be known about the development of the language. On the other hand, there was a revival of academic life in Greece after the establishment of the Greek state in 1830, and scholars in Greece were at first reluctant to accept the seemingly foreign idea that Greek should have been pronounced so differently from what they knew.

Comparative linguistics led to a picture of ancient Greek that more or less corroborated Erasmus' view, though with some modifications. Gr.  : Lat. ); that many instances of  had earlier been  (cf. For the consonants, historical linguistics established the originally plosive nature of both the aspirates   and the mediae  , which were recognised to be a direct continuation of similar sounds in Indo-European (reconstructed  and ). It was also recognised that the word-initial spiritus asper was most often a reflex of earlier  (cf. Work was also done reconstructing the linguistic background to the rules of ancient Greek versification, especially in Homer, which shed important light on the phonology regarding syllable structure and accent. Scholars also described and explained the regularities in the development of consonants and vowels under processes of assimilation, reduplication, compensatory lengthening etc.

While comparative linguistics could in this way firmly establish that a certain source state, roughly along the Erasmian model, had once obtained, and that significant changes had to have occurred later, during the development towards Modern Greek, the comparative method had less to say about the question when these changes took place. Erasmus had been eager to find a pronunciation system that corresponded most closely to the written letters, and it was now natural to assume that the reconstructed sound system was that which obtained at the time when Greek orthography was in its formative period. For a time, it was taken for granted that this would also have been the pronunciation valid for all the period of classical literature. However, it was perfectly possible that the pronunciation of the living language had begun to move on from that reconstructed system towards that of Modern Greek, possibly already quite early during antiquity.

In this context, the freshly emerging evidence from the non-standard inscriptions became of decisive importance. Critics of the Erasmian reconstruction drew attention to the systematic patterns of spelling mistakes made by scribes. This provided evidence that these vowels had already begun to merge in the living speech of the period. While some scholars in Greece were quick to emphasise these findings in order to cast doubt on the Erasmian system as a whole, some western European scholars tended to downplay them, explaining early instances of such orthographical aberrations as either isolated exceptions or influences from non-Attic, non-standard dialects.

It was not until the early 20th century and the work of G. Chatzidakis, a linguist often credited with having first introduced the methods of modern historical linguistics into the Greek academic establishment, that the validity of the comparative method and its reconstructions for Greek began to be widely accepted among Greek scholars too.

More recent developments
Since the 1970s and 1980s, several scholars have attempted a systematic re-evaluation of the inscriptional and papyrological evidence (Smith 1972, Teodorsson 1974, 1977, 1978; Gignac 1976; Threatte 1980, summary in Horrocks 1999). According to their results, many of the relevant phonological changes can be dated fairly early, reaching well into the classical period, and the period of the Koiné can be characterised as one of very rapid phonological change. Many of the changes in vowel quality are now dated to some time between the 5th and the 1st centuries BC, while those in the consonants are assumed to have been completed by the 4th century AD. However, there is still considerable debate over precise dating, and it is still not clear to what degree, and for how long, different pronunciation systems would have persisted side by side within the Greek speech community. The resulting majority view today is that a phonological system roughly along Erasmian lines can still be assumed to have been valid for the period of classical Attic literature, but biblical and other post-classical Koine Greek is likely to have been spoken with a pronunciation that already approached that of Modern Greek in many crucial respects.

Footnotes

Bibliography

Recent literature

 
C. C. Caragounis (1995): "The error of Erasmus and un-Greek pronunciations of Greek". Filologia Neotestamentaria 8 (16).
C. C. Caragounis (2004): Development of Greek and the New Testament, Mohr Siebeck.
A.-F. Christidis ed. (2007), A History of Ancient Greek, Cambridge University Press: A. Malikouti-Drachmann, "The phonology of Classical Greek", 524–544; E. B. Petrounias, "The pronunciation of Ancient Greek: Evidence and hypotheses", 556–570; idem, "The pronunciation of Classical Greek", 556–570.

G. Horrocks (1997): Greek: A History of the Language and Its Speakers. London: Addison Wesley.
F.T. Gignac (1976): A Grammar of the Greek Papyri of the Roman and Byzantine Periods. Volume 1: Phonology. Milan: Istituto Editoriale Cisalpino-La Goliardica.

C. Karvounis (2008): Aussprache und Phonologie im Altgriechischen ("Pronunciation and Phonology in Ancient Greek"). Darmstadt: Wissenschaftliche Buchgesellschaft.
M. Lejeune (1972): Phonétique historique du mycénien et du grec ancien ("Historical phonetics of Mycenean and Ancient Greek"), Paris: Librairie Klincksieck (reprint 2005).
H. Rix (1992): Historische Grammatik des Griechischen. Laut- und Formenlehre ("Historical Grammar of Greek. Phonology and Morphology"), Darmstadt: Wissenschaftliche Buchgesellschaft (2nd edition).

R. B. Smith (1972): Empirical evidences and theoretical interpretations of Greek phonology: Prolegomena to a theory of sound patterns in the Hellenistic Koine, Ph.D. diss. Indiana University.
S.-T. Teodorsson (1974): The phonemic system of the Attic dialect 400-340 BC. Göteborg: Acta Universitatis Gothoburgensis (ASIN B0006CL51U).
S.-T. Teodorsson (1977): The phonology of Ptolemaic Koine (Studia Graeca et Latina Gothoburgensia), Göteborg.
S.-T. Teodorsson (1978): The phonology of Attic in the Hellenistic period (Studia Graeca et Latina Gothoburgensia), Göteborg: Acta Universitatis Gothoburgensis.
L. Threatte (1980): The Grammar of Attic Inscriptions, vol. 1: Phonology, Berlin: de Gruyter.

Older literature
G. Babiniotis: Ιστορική Γραμματεία της Αρχαίας Ελληνικής Γλώσσας, 1. Φωνολογία ("Historical Grammar of the Ancient Greek Language: 1. Phonology")
F. Blass (1870): Über die Aussprache des Griechischen, Berlin: Weidmannsche Buchhandlung.
I. Bywater, The Erasmian Pronunciation of Greek and its Precursors, Oxford: 1908. Defends Erasmus from the claim that he hastily wrote his Dialogus based on a hoax.  Mentions Erasmus's predecessors Jerome Aleander, Aldus Manutius, and Antonio of Lebrixa. Short review in The Journal of Hellenic Studies 29 (1909), p. 133. .
E. A. S. Dawes (1894): The Pronunciation of Greek aspirates, D. Nutt.
E. M. Geldart (1870): The Modern Greek Language In Its Relation To Ancient Greek (reprint 2004, Lightning Source Inc. ).
G. N. Hatzidakis (1902): Ἀκαδημαϊκὰ ἀναγνώσματα: ἡ προφορὰ τῆς ἀρχαίας Ἑλληνικῆς ("Academic Studies: The pronunciation of Ancient Greek").

A. Meillet (1975) Aperçu d'une histoire de la langue grecque, Paris: Librairie Klincksieck (8th edition).
A. Meillet & J. Vendryes (1968): Traité de grammaire comparée des langues classiques, Paris: Librairie Ancienne Honoré Champion (4th edition).

E. Schwyzer (1939): Griechische Grammatik, vol. 1, Allgemeiner Teil. Lautlehre. Wortbildung. Flexion, München: C.H. Beck (repr. 1990 ).

W. B. Stanford (1967): The Sound of Greek.

Ancient Greek sources

Aristotle

All speech consists of these categories: element [letter], syllable, conjunction, noun, verb, inflection, phrase.

A letter is an indivisible sound — not any sound, but a sound from which a compound sound [syllable] can naturally be made, since the sounds of animals are also indivisible, and I call none of them a letter. The categories of sound are sounding [vowels], half-sounding [semivowels: fricatives and sonorants], and unsounded [silent or mute: stop].

These categories are the vowel, which has audible sound but no contact [between lips or between tongue and the inside of the mouth]; the semivowel, which has audible sound and contact (for example s and r); and the mute, which has contact and no sound by itself, becoming audible only with [letters] that have a sound (for example g and d).

[Letters] differ in the shape of the mouth and place [in the mouth], in thickness and thinness [aspiration and unaspiration], in length and shortness — and still more in sharpness and depth and middle [high and low pitch, and pitch between the two]: but theorizing about them in detail is the job of those who study [poetic] meter.

Dionysius Thrax

There are 24 letters, from a to ō.... Letters are also called elements [of speech] because they have an order and classification.

Of these, seven are vowels: a, e, ē, i, o, y, ō. They are called vowels because they form a complete sound by themselves.

Two of the vowels are long (ē and ō), two are short (e and o), and three are two-timed (a i y). They are called two-timed since they can be lengthened and shortened.

Five are prefixable vowels: a, e, ē, o, ō. They are called prefixable because they form a complete syllable when prefixed before i and y: for instance, ai au. Two are suffixable: i and y. And y is sometimes prefixable before i, as in myia and harpyia.

Six are diphthongs: ai au ei eu oi ou.

The remaining seventeen letters are consonants [pronounced-with]: b, g, d, z, th, k, l, m, n, x, p, r, s, t, ph, kh, ps. They are called consonants because they do not have a sound on their own, but they form a complete sound when arranged with vowels.

Of these, eight are semivowels: z, x, ps, l, m, n, r, s. They are called semivowels, because, though a little weaker than the vowels, they still sound pleasant in hummings and hissings.

Nine are mutes: b, g, d, k, p, t, th, ph, kh. They are called mute, because, more than the others, they sound bad, just as we call a performer of tragedy who sounds bad voiceless. Three of these are thin (k, p, t), three are thick (th, ph, kh), and three of them are middle [intermediate] (b, g, d). They are called middle, because they are thicker than the thin [mutes], but thinner than the thick [mutes]. And b is [the mute] between p and ph, g between k and kh, and d between th and t.

The thick [mutes] alternate with the thin ones, ph with p, as in [an example from the Odyssey]; kh with k: [another example from the Odyssey]; th with t: [an example from the Iliad].

In addition, three consonants are double: z, x, ps. They are called double because each one of them is made up of two consonants: z from s and d, x from k and s, and ps from p and s.

There are four unchangeable [consonants]: l, m, n, r. They are called unchangeable because they do not change in the future [tense]s of verbs and in the declensions of nouns. They are also called liquids.

External links
 University of California, Berkeley: Practice of Ancient Greek pronunciation
 Society for the oral reading of Greek and Latin Literature: Recitation of classics books
 Desiderius Erasmus, De recta Latini Graecique sermonis pronuntiatione dialogus (alternative link)  
 Brian Joseph, Ancient Greek, Modern Greek
 Harry Foundalis, Greek Alphabet and pronunciation
 Carl W. Conrad, A Compendium of Ancient Greek Phonology: about phonology strictly speaking, and not phonetics
 Randall Buth, Ἡ κοινὴ προφορά: Notes on the Pronunciation System of Phonemic Koine Greek
 Chrys C. Caragounis, The error of Erasmus and un-Greek pronunciations of Greek
 Sidney Allen, Vox Graeca (only a preview available, but still useful).
 Saverio Dalpedri, Götz Keydana, Stavros Skopeteas, glottothèque - Ancient Indo-European Grammars online: an online collection of introductory videos to Ancient Indo-European languages, including Ancient Greek phonology

Phonology
Greek phonologies